Aporia acraea is a butterfly species in family Pieridae. The species occurs in China, where it is found in western Sichuan and northern Yunnan.

Former subspecies
 Aporia acraea wolongensis (now Aporia wolongensis)
 Aporia acraea koiwayai (now Aporia wolongensis koiwayai)
 Aporia acraea tayiensis (now Aporia tayiensis)
 Aporia acraea lotis (junior synonym of Aporia acraea)

Original description

References

Pierini
Butterflies of Asia
Butterflies described in 1885
Taxa named by Charles Oberthür